Frédéric Chopin's four ballades are single-movement pieces for solo piano, composed between 1831 and 1842. They are considered to be some of the most important and challenging pieces in the standard piano repertoire.

Form  
The term ballade was used by Chopin in the sense of a balletic interlude or dance-piece, equivalent to the old Italian ballata, but the term may also have connotations of the medieval heroic ballad, a narrative minstrel-song, often of a fantastical character. There are dramatic and dance-like elements in Chopin's use of the genre, and he may be said to be a pioneer of the ballade as an abstract musical form. The four ballades are said to have been inspired by a friend of Chopin’s, poet Adam Mickiewicz. The exact inspiration for each individual ballade, however, is unclear and disputed.

Though the ballades do not conform exactly to sonata form, the "ballade form" created by Chopin for his four ballades is a variant of sonata form with specific discrepancies, such as the mirror reprise (presenting the two expositional themes in reverse order during the recapitulation). The ballades have directly influenced composers such as Franz Liszt and Johannes Brahms who, after Chopin, wrote ballades of their own.

Besides sharing the title, the four ballades are entities distinct from each other. According to composer and music critic Louis Ehlert, "Each [ballade] differs entirely from the others, and they have but one thing in common – their romantic working out and the nobility of their motifs." Modern theorists have shown, however, that the ballades do have much in common, such as the "ballade meter" ( or ) and certain formal practices like the mirror reprise and delaying the structural dominant.

Ballade No. 1 

The Ballade No. 1 in G minor, Op. 23, was completed in 1835 in Paris.

Ballade No. 2 

The Ballade No. 2 in F major, Op. 38, was composed from 1836 to 1839 in Nohant, France, and on the Spanish island of Mallorca.

Ballade No. 3 

The Ballade No. 3 in A major, Op. 47, was composed in 1841 in Nohant.

Ballade No. 4 

The Ballade No. 4 in F minor, Op. 52, was composed in 1842 in Paris and Nohant and revised in 1843.

Recordings 
The four ballades have been recorded by many pianists, including Arthur Rubinstein,  Vladimir Ashkenazy, Dinu Lipatti, Sviatoslav Richter, Martha Argerich, Emanuel Ax, Andrei Gavrilov, Yundi Li, Seong-Jin Cho, Murray Perahia and Krystian Zimerman. The Guardian has described Krystian Zimerman's recording with Deutsche Grammophon as a "key recording".

References

External links 

 

Compositions by Frédéric Chopin
Piano ballades